Abdul Wahab Naser Al-Safra (born 29 April 1949) is a Saudi Arabian middle-distance runner. He competed in the men's 1500 metres at the 1972 Summer Olympics.

References

1949 births
Living people
Athletes (track and field) at the 1972 Summer Olympics
Saudi Arabian male middle-distance runners
Olympic athletes of Saudi Arabia
Place of birth missing (living people)